Ritual (Ritual) is the fifth album by Argentine rock band Los Piojos, released in 1999.

Track listing 
 Olvidate (ya ves) [Forget it (you see)]
 Chactuchac [Chac tu chac]
 Desde lejos no se ve [You can't see from far]
 Ay ay ay [Ay ay ay]
 Angelito [Little angel]
 Agua [Water]
 Arco [Arch]
 Tan solo [So lonely]
 Intro Maradó  [Maradó intro]
 Maradó  [Maradó]
 Ando ganas (Llora llora) [I'm looking forward to (cry cry)]
 Cruel [Cruel]
 Todo pasa [Everything happens]
 Around & Around/Zapatos de gamuza azul [Around & Around/Blue suede shoes]
 It's Only Rock & Roll [It's Only Rock & Roll]

External links 
 Ritual on Rock.com.ar 

1999 live albums
Los Piojos albums
Live albums recorded in Buenos Aires